Guðmundur Gíslason (born 19 January 1941) is an Icelandic former butterfly, freestyle and medley swimmer. He competed at the 1960, 1964, 1968 and the 1972 Summer Olympics.

References

External links
 

1941 births
Living people
Icelandic male butterfly swimmers
Icelandic male freestyle swimmers
Icelandic male medley swimmers
Olympic swimmers of Iceland
Swimmers at the 1960 Summer Olympics
Swimmers at the 1964 Summer Olympics
Swimmers at the 1968 Summer Olympics
Swimmers at the 1972 Summer Olympics
Sportspeople from Reykjavík